Neripteron violaceum is a species of brackish water snail, an aquatic gastropod mollusk in the family Neritidae, the nerites.

Description

Distribution
India: Andaman Islands, Andhra Pradesh, Goa, Gujarat, Kerala, Kamataka, Orissa, Tamilnadu and West Bengal; Sri Lanka, Burma, Thailand, Cambodia, Vietnam, Singapore, Indonesia, Timor, New Caledonia, Samoa, Fiji, Australia, Philippines and Japan

Human use
It is a part of ornamental pet trade for freshwater aquaria.

References

External links
 
 Gmelin J.F. (1791). Vermes. In: Gmelin J.F. (Ed.) Caroli a Linnaei Systema Naturae per Regna Tria Naturae, Ed. 13. Tome 1(6). G.E. Beer, Lipsiae
 Lamarck, [J.-B. M.] de. (1822). Histoire naturelle des animaux sans vertèbres. Tome sixième, 2me partie. Paris: published by the Author, 232 pp
 Benson, W. H. (1836). Descriptive catalogue of a collection of land and fresh-water shells, chiefly contained in the Museum of the Asiatic Society. Journal of the Asiatic Society of Bengal. 5(59): 741–750
 Souleyet (L.F.A.). (1842). Description de cinq nouvelles espèces de nérites fluviales provenant du voyage de la Bonite. Revue Zoologique par la Société Cuviérienne. (1842): 269-270
 Récluz, C. A. (1850). Des Neritines, section des Crepidiformes (sandaliformes; Mitrulae, Menke, Synop. moll 1830). Journal de Conchyliologie. 1: 58-72

Neritidae
Gastropods described in 1791
Taxa named by Johann Friedrich Gmelin